The Batho Baronetcy, of Frinton in the County of Essex, is a title in the Baronetage of the United Kingdom, and was created on 19 October 1928 for Sir Charles Albert Batho. He was educated at Highgate School from 1882 to 1885, was an Alderman of the City of London from 1921 to 1938, and Lord Mayor of London from 1927 to 1928. As of 2007, the title is held by his grandson, the third Baronet, who succeeded his father in 1990.

Batho baronets, of Frinton (1928)
Sir Charles Albert Batho, 1st Baronet (7 October 1872 – 29 January 1938)
Sir Maurice Benjamin Batho, 2nd Baronet (1910–1990)
Sir Peter Ghislain Batho, 3rd Baronet (born 1939)

Notes

References
Kidd, Charles, Williamson, David (editors). Debrett's Peerage and Baronetage (1990 edition). New York: St Martin's Press, 1990, 

Batho